Gymnopilus areolatus is a species of mushroom-forming fungus in the family Hymenogastraceae. It was first formally described by American mycologist William Alphonso Murrill, from specimens collected in Cuba.

Description

Habitat and distribution
Gymnopilus areolatus typically grows clumped together on stumps, and logs of hardwoods and palms. It is found in Cuba in May and September.

See also

 List of Gymnopilus species

References

areolatus
Fungi of North America
Taxa named by William Alphonso Murrill
Fungi described in 1913